Kassim Mukhtar (born 1927, date of death unknown) was an Iraqi middle-distance runner. He competed in the men's 1500 metres at the 1960 Summer Olympics.

References

1927 births
Year of death missing
Athletes (track and field) at the 1960 Summer Olympics
Iraqi male middle-distance runners
Iraqi male long-distance runners
Olympic athletes of Iraq
Place of birth missing